Maireana suaedifolia, the lax bluebush, is a species of flowering plant in the family Amaranthaceae, native to Western Australia and South Australia. It is typically found growing in alluvial plains or on sand dunes.

References

suaedifolia
Endemic flora of Australia
Flora of Western Australia
Flora of South Australia
Plants described in 1975